Best Reggae Video (最優秀レゲエビデオ賞)

Results
The following table displays the nominees and the winners in bold print with a yellow background.

2000s

2010s